Joshua Cooley (born May 23, 1979) is an American animator, screenwriter, director and voice actor. He is best known for directing the 2019 film Toy Story 4, the fourth film of the Toy Story franchise, for which he won the Academy Award for Best Animated Feature. He also worked on the 2015 Pixar animated film Inside Out and directed the short film Riley's First Date? that was included in its home video release.

Career 
Cooley was recruited by Joe Ranft at Pixar, where he started his career as an intern, mostly working as a storyboard artist on films including The Incredibles (2004), the first two films of the Cars franchise (2006-2011), Ratatouille (2007), and Up (2009). In 2009, Cooley wrote and directed a short film George & A.J. for Pixar and Walt Disney Pictures.

In 2015, Cooley worked as a screenwriter and storyboard supervisor on the film Inside Out, which was released to critical acclaim. Cooley received an Academy Award nomination for Best Original Screenplay for his work on the film, alongside Pete Docter (the film's director), Ronnie Del Carmen (co-director), and Meg LeFauve. The same year, he wrote and directed another short film titled Riley's First Date?.

Following the success of Inside Out, Cooley was tapped by John Lasseter and screenwriter Andrew Stanton to co-direct Toy Story 4. Lasseter ended up setting aside his directorial duties in 2016, making Cooley the sole director. Toy Story 4 was Cooley's directorial debut. Upon release, the film received critical acclaim, and Cooley took home his first Academy Award for Best Animated Feature. Cooley left Pixar in March 2020.

Cooley is set to direct an animated Transformers film at Paramount Pictures. The film, which will be "separate and apart from" the Michael Bay-directed franchise and the stand-alone Bumblebee, will focus on Optimus Prime and Megatron's relationship. On May 19, 2020, it was reported that Cooley will write and direct a live-action adaptation of the children's book Malamander for Sony Pictures, marking his first live-action film.

On July 10, 2020, it was announced that Cooley would be the writer and director of the film Little Monsters, starring Universal Monsters characters, for Universal Pictures.

Filmography

Films

Shorts

Other credits

References

External links 

 

1979 births
American film directors
American male screenwriters
American male voice actors
American storyboard artists
American animated film directors
Animation screenwriters
Animators from California
Annie Award winners
Living people
Cartoon Network Studios people
Pixar people
Directors of Best Animated Feature Academy Award winners